Eric Nyberg is a professor in the Language Technologies Institute of the School of Computer Science at Carnegie Mellon University. He is the director for the Master of Computational Data Science (formerly known as the M.S. in Very Large Information Systems).
 
Nyberg has made significant research contributions to the fields of automatic text translation, information retrieval, and automatic question answering. He received his Ph.D. from Carnegie Mellon University (1992), and his B.A. from Boston University (1983). He has pioneered the Open Advancement of Question Answering, an architecture and methodology for accelerating collaborative research in automatic question answering.

In 2011, Nyberg received the Allen Newell Award for Research Excellence for his scientific contributions to the field of question answering and his work on the Watson project. He received the BU Computer Science Distinguished Alumna/Alumnus Award on September 27, 2013.

References

External links 
 Personal homepage
 OAQA Project Homepage

Living people
Year of birth missing (living people)
Machine translation researchers